L13 or L-13 may refer to:

Vehicles
 LET L-13 Blaník, a trainer glider
 , a Leninets-class submarine
 Stinson L-13, an American utility aircraft
 Zeppelin LZ 45, a German airship

Proteins 
 60S ribosomal protein L13
 Mitochondrial ribosomal protein L13
 Ribosomal protein L13 leader, a family of human genes

Other uses
 Barcelona Metro line 13
 Kwese language
 Nissan L13 engine